Rubicon is the debut studio album by The Duggans (brothers Noel and Padraig, members of Clannad). It was released in 2005.

From the press release:On this, their first solo album, they have gathered together friends made over the years for a remarkable collaboration of talents. They have, perhaps, travelled full circle.

In an official interview on Clannad's official website, Padraig Duggan explains the song "Liza", which appeared on Clannad's debut album as well as on Rubicon. The song is used internationally in schools and on Summer Gaeltacht courses in Belfast, Donegal and further afield:

In the early 1970’s, Clannad won the Letterkenny Folk Festival with that song. I actually wrote it up on the roof of Leo's Tavern! I was up there for some reason with my guitar. It is an upbeat popsong, I suppose I was influenced by bands such as The Beatles. It was a unique song at the time - a popsong in Gaeilge! It proved popular in the local schools - the young people seemed to adopt it.

Track listing

 "Báidín Fheilimidh"
 "Memories"
 "The Bird"
 "Fanann na Cnoic"
 "Away"
 "Tá Mo Chleamhnas a Dhéanamh"
 "Nóinín / The Mucky Duck"
 "The Rubicon"
 "Hughie"
 "Óró Se Do Bheatha Abhaile!"
 "Lúrabóg"
 "The Silent Spring"
 "An Saighdiúir Tréigthe"
 "Liza"
 "The Blue Stack Mountains"

Personnel
 Éamonn deBarra
 Kerstin Blodig
 Máire Breatnach
 Brídín Brennan
 Deirdre Brennan
 Moya Brennan
 Ciaran Byrne
 Paul Byrne
 Orlagh Fallon
 Urs Fuchs
 Finbar Furey
 Peter Jack
 David James
 Ingolf Kurkowski
 Thomas Loefke
 Patsy Dan Rodgers (King of Tory Island)
 Ian Melrose
 Sean Moore
 Aidan O'Brien
 Ian Parker
 Andrew Roberts

Production
 Ciaran Byrne - mixing
Ian (Vance) Melrose - mixing
Jorg Surrey - engineer
Carol Wilson - graphic design
Sinéad Duggan - sleeve notes

References

External links
 Album Interview
 Clannad Fan site

2005 debut albums
The Duggans albums